Teppei Takano (born 25 November 1983) is a Japanese ski jumper.

In the World Cup he finished once among the top 10, recording a ninth place from February 2003 in Willingen.

At the 2003 FIS Nordic World Ski Championships he finished 26th in the normal hill.

External links

1983 births
Living people
Japanese male ski jumpers